The Intel Museum located at Intel's headquarters in Santa Clara, California, United States, has exhibits of Intel's products and history as well as semiconductor technology in general.  The museum is open weekdays and Saturdays except holidays.  It is open to the public with free admission.
The museum was started in the early 1980s as an internal project at Intel to record its history.  It opened to the public in 1992, later being expanded in 1999 to triple its size and add a store.  It has exhibits about how semiconductor chip technology works, both as self-paced exhibits and by reservation as grade-school educational programs.

A fully functional 130x scale replica of the Intel 4004 CPU was built using discrete transistors and put on display in 2006.

References

External links 
 Intel Museum official site

Gallery 

Museum
Computer museums in California
Museums in Santa Clara, California